Paspaul (Paspauul) is a rural locality (a selo) and the administrative centre of Paspaulskoye Rural Settlement of Choysky District, the Altai Republic, Russia. The population was 1243 as of 2016. There are 21 streets.

Geography 
Paspaul is located east from Gorno-Altaysk, in the valley of the Malaya Isha River, 19 km southwest of Choya (the district's administrative centre) by road. Sugul is the nearest rural locality.

References 

Rural localities in Choysky District